Traveller is a 1999 Brazilian drama film directed by Paulo César Saraceni. It was entered into the 21st Moscow International Film Festival where it won a Special Mention.

Cast
 Marília Pêra as Donana
 Leandra Leal as Sinhá
 Paulo Cesar Pereio as Chico Herrera
 Irma Álvarez as Rosália
 Roberto Bonfim
 Priscila Camargo
 Nelson Dantas as Mestre Juca
 Leina Krespi
 Jairo Mattos as Fael
 Ricardo Graça Mello as Zeca
 Ana Maria Nascimento e Silva as Anita
 Milton Nascimento

References

External links
 

1999 films
1999 drama films
1990s Portuguese-language films
Brazilian drama films